Junior Paulo may refer to:

 Junior Paulo (rugby league born 1983)
 Junior Paulo (rugby league born 1993)

See also
 Junior Polu (born 1981), Samoan rugby union player